Xie Pengfei (born 29 June 1993) is a Chinese professional footballer who currently plays for Chinese Super League club Wuhan Three Towns.

Club career
Xie Pengfei started his football career when he joined Hangzhou Greentown's youth academy from Shenzhen Yantian Sports School in 2006. He was loaned out to Ligue 2 side FC Metz along with Liu Binbin for youth training in 2010. Xie returned to Hangzhou during the 2011 season and was loaned to third tier side Wenzhou Provenza for the rest of the season. He scored his first goal for the club on 20 September 2011 in a 2-1 win against Chongqing F.C.

Xie was promoted to the club's first team by then manager Takeshi Okada in the 2012 season. He made his debut for the club on 22 April 2012 in a 2-0 loss against Tianjin Teda. He scored his first goal for the club on 26 June 2012 in a 3-0 win against Shanghai East Asia in the 2012 Chinese FA Cup.

On 12 February 2016, Xie transferred to fellow Chinese Super League side Jiangsu Suning. He made his debut for the club on 23 February 2016 in a 1-1 draw against Becamex Binh Duong in the 2016 AFC Champions League. He scored his first goal for the club on 17 September 2016 in a 2-0 win against Tianjin Teda. He would go on to establish himself as a regular within the team and in the 2020 Chinese Super League season he would win the clubs first league title with them. On 28 February 2021, the parent company of the club Suning Holdings Group announced that operations were going to cease immediately due to financial difficulties.

On 2 April 2021, Xie transferred to another top tier club in Cangzhou Mighty Lions. He would go on to make his debut in a league game against Qingdao on 21 April 2021, in a 2-1 defeat. After only one season he left to join newly promoted top tier side Wuhan Three Towns On 29 April 2022. He would go on to make his debut on 3 June 2022, in a league game against Hebei, which ended in a 4-0 victory. After the game he would go on to establish himself as a regular within the team that won the 2022 Chinese Super League title.

International career
Xie received his first call-up to the Chinese under-20 national team when he was called up by then manager Su Maozhen in May 2011. He played for the team during the 2011 Toulon Tournament and 2013 Toulon Tournament. He also made two appearances during 2012 AFC U-19 Championship qualification as the under-20 side qualified for the 2012 AFC U-19 Championship in November 2011. He made his debut for the Chinese national team in a 1-0 loss against Thailand in the 2019 China Cup.

Career statistics

Club statistics

International statistics

Honours

Club
Jiangsu Suning
Chinese Super League: 2020

Wuhan Three Towns
Chinese Super League: 2022.

References

External links
 

1993 births
Living people
Association football midfielders
Chinese footballers
Footballers from Guizhou
Zhejiang Professional F.C. players
Jiangsu F.C. players
Chinese Super League players
China League Two players
People from Guiyang
Footballers at the 2014 Asian Games
Asian Games competitors for China